Bellerive Country Club is a golf country club in the central United States, located in Town and Country, Missouri, a suburb west of St. Louis. With the Old Warson, Westwood, and St. Louis country clubs, it is considered one of the "big four" old-line elite St. Louis clubs. The course has hosted three major championships: the U.S. Open in 1965, and the PGA Championship in 1992 and 2018.

History
The club opened  in 1897 as The Field Club, founded by several St. Louis sportsmen who wanted a place for golf and other leisure activities. Northwest of St. Louis, the course featured nine holes until another nine were added some years later. It was built on land leased from the estate of War of 1812 war hero Daniel Bissell.

In 1910, the club moved to nearby Normandy and renamed the Bellerive Country Club after Louis Groston de Saint-Ange de Bellerive, the last French governor of Illinois Country in 1765. With a Georgian-style clubhouse, Bellerive's first notable event was the 1949 Western Amateur Championship. Four years later, it  hosted the PGA Tour's Western Open, won by Dutch Harrison. 

In 1957, Bellerive put its  Normandy site on the market for $1.3 million.  At the same time, the Normandy School District began discussing the need for establishing a junior college as an affordable alternative to the privately-owned Washington University and Saint Louis University.  The club lowered the price to $600,000 and the Normandy Residence Center opened in a renovated clubhouse in 1960 with classes taught by the University of Missouri; the campus became the University of Missouri–St. Louis in 1963 and the nearby village is Bellerive.

Current location
In 1959, the club moved southwest to its current site in the suburb of Town and Country. Robert Trent Jones designed the new course, which opened  in 1960 on Memorial Day. Five years later, Bellerive hosted its first USGA championship and major championship, the U.S. Open in 1965, in which Gary Player won in a Monday playoff over Kel Nagle. It was the first U.S. Open scheduled for a Sunday final round; previously the third and fourth rounds were played on Saturday. Player was the first foreign-born player to win the U.S. Open in 38 years, and completed the career Grand Slam at age 29, a year before Jack Nicklaus did. It was the fourth of Player's nine major titles and his only victory in the U.S. Open; he won with fiberglass-shafted golf clubs, and donated his winner's check to charity.

Bellerive hosted the inaugural U.S. Mid-Amateur in 1981, won by Jim Holtgrieve, and its second major with the PGA Championship in 1992. Nick Price won the first of his three majors with a score of 278 (–6), three strokes ahead of four runners-up.

The U.S. Mid-Amateur was held at Old Warson Golf Club in 1999, and Bellerive was used in the 36-hole stroke play qualifying portion. In 2001, the course was hosting practice rounds for the WGC-American Express Championship scheduled for  but the event was abandoned as a result of the terrorist attacks on the morning of the practice  The U.S. Senior Open, a senior major, was held at the course in 2004 and won by Peter Jacobsen.

The course hosted the BMW Championship (formerly the Western Open) in September 2008, the third of the four-part FedEx Cup playoffs. The top seventy players on the points list competed for the final thirty spots in The Tour Championship, and it was won by Camilo Villegas. Bellerive hosted another senior major in 2013, the Senior PGA Championship, won by Japanese pro Kōki Idoki, and was again the site of the PGA Championship in 2018, won by Brooks Koepka with a record-equalling 72-hole low score for a major championship of 264; he finished two strokes ahead of Tiger Woods.

Tournaments hosted

Bold indicates major championship
The course also hosted the practice rounds for the WGC-American Express Championship in September 2001, but the event was abandoned after the terrorist attacks on the morning of Tuesday

Future events
2026 BMW Championship
2030 Presidents Cup

Course 
However, the 10th hole is often played as a par 4 in professional events, making the course a par 71. Bellerive has a course and slope rating of 76.3/141 from the championship tees.

Bellerive was built around a large creek that comes into play on nine of the holes.  Water hazards come into play on 11 holes, and the course is known for its large and undulating greens. Bent grass is used for the greens, and zoysia grass is used for the fairways.  

The entire course underwent a $9.5 million renovation in 2005-06 because the county needed to install new sewer lines under most of the course, not to prepare for the BMW Championship. The redesign was done by Rees Jones, who lengthened and toughened U.S. Open courses Winged Foot and Torrey Pines Golf Course.  The most notable renovations that the "Open Doctor" imposed on Bellerive can be found on holes 2, 7, and 8.  Hole 2 used to be tight par 4 with a sharp dogleg left around a group of trees and small lake with a prominent bunker guarding the right side.  Jones removed the trees along the left and expanded the lake to create a risk-reward tee shot.  The lake now stretches all the way to the green, creating a difficult back left pin position. 

For Hole 7, which used to be a straight but narrow par 4 with bunkers guarding both sides of the landing area,  Jones recreated the bunker complex on the right side of the hole to punish any player who bails out of a swing.  Jones also moved the green back and to the left in order to bring the creek into play, once again, creating a tough back left pin location.

Hole 8 has always been one of the toughest on the course due to the double dogleg (first left and then right) and creek that lines the right side.  Prior to Jones' redesigns, the tee boxes for the hole were all on the left side of the creek which meant that the tee shot needed to be a right-to-left hook that curved around the trees on the left, but avoided the creek on the right.  The creek on the right was lined with mature trees which sometimes knocked errant shots headed for doom back onto the fairway in prime position.  Jones eliminated this randomness in his redesign by cutting down the majority of the trees that lined the creek.  Also, Jones moved the back tees to the right side of the creek so a straighter drive would function.  However, Jones added a deep, massive bunker on the inside (left) of the first dogleg to punish the greedy player.  The bunker has since been removed and the fairway has been widened. This gives players a better chance to reach the green in two strokes. 

Hole 11 has also undergone a few minor changes. All of the tee boxes have been moved up roughly 50 yards, creating a risk reward driveable par 4. 

Other renovations include,
     
Hole 1  (fairway and green bunker complexes)
Hole 3  (tee boxes)
Hole 4  (fairway and green bunker complexes)
Hole 5  (green bunker complexes)
Hole 6  (green redesign and bunker complexes)
Hole 9  (fairway and green bunker complexes)
Hole 10 (fairway and green bunker complexes)
Hole 11 (fairway and green bunker complexes)
Hole 12 (fairway and green bunker complexes, and tee boxes)
Hole 13 (green bunker complexes)
Hole 14 (fairway and green bunker complexes, tree removal)
Hole 15 (fairway and green bunker complexes)
Hole 16 (green bunker complexes)
Hole 17 (fairway and green bunker complexes, lake removal)
Hole 18 (fairway and green bunker complexes)

Scorecard 

Source:

See also
 Algonquin Golf Club

References

External links 
 

1897 establishments in Missouri
Buildings and structures in St. Louis County, Missouri
Golf clubs and courses designed by Rees Jones
Golf clubs and courses designed by Robert Trent Jones
Golf clubs and courses in Missouri
Sports in Greater St. Louis
Sports venues completed in 1897
Tourist attractions in St. Louis County, Missouri